Hamletavan is a town in the Kapan community of the Syunik Province of Armenia. Hamletavan is situated west of Shgharshik, and east of Nerkin Giratagh.

It was named Hamletavan in the honor of Hamlet Kocharyan, an Armenian soldier.

See also 

 Syunik Province
 Kapan Municipality
 Shgharshik
 Nerkin Giratagh

References 

Populated places in Syunik Province